Rhodocactus nemorosus is a species of flowering plant in the cactus family Cactaceae, native to southern Brazil, Paraguay, Uruguay and northeast Argentina. Like all species in the genus Rhodocactus and unlike most cacti, it has persistent leaves. It was first described by Nicolás Rojas Acosta in 1897 as Pereskia nemorosa, and transferred to Rhodocactus in 2016.

Description
Mature stems develop bark and, unlike other species of Rhodocactus, do not have stomata. The fruits are pear-shaped, green or yellowish-green when ripe.

Taxonomy
The species was first described by Nicolás Rojas Acosta in 1897 as Pereskia nemorosa. Molecular phylogenetic studies suggested that when broadly circumscribed, Pereskia was not monophyletic, and consisted of three clades. In 2016, the genus Rhodocactus was revived for one of these clades, which included R. nemorosus.

Distribution and habitat
Rhodocactus nemorosus is native to southern Brazil, Paraguay, Uruguay and northeast Argentina. It is found in drier wooded habitats.

References

Pereskioideae
Flora of Northeast Argentina
Flora of South Brazil
Flora of Paraguay
Flora of Uruguay
Plants described in 1897